is a trans-Neptunian object, a scattered disc classified as a scattered and detached object, located in the outermost region of the Solar System. It was first observed on 24 March 2014, by a team led by American astronomer Scott Sheppard at the Cerro Tololo Inter-American Observatory in Chile. With its perihelion of almost 56 AU, it belongs to a small and poorly understood group of very distant objects with moderate eccentricities.

Discovery and naming 

 was first observed on 24 March 2014 by a team of astronomers led by Scott Sheppard of the Carnegie Institution for Science as part of the survey for distant solar system objects beyond the Kuiper Cliff using the new wide-field cameras on the Subaru and  Cerro Tololo Inter-American Observatory (CTIO) telescopes.

Orbit and classification 

 orbits the Sun at a distance of 55.8–95.8 AU once every 660 years and 3 months (241,142 days; semi-major axis of 75.82 AU). Its orbit has a moderate eccentricity of 0.26 and an inclination of 26° with respect to the ecliptic.

Considered a scattered and detached object,  is particularly unusual as it has an unusually circular orbit for a scattered-disc object (SDO). Although it is thought that traditional scattered-disc objects have been ejected into their current orbits by gravitational interactions with Neptune, the low eccentricity of its orbit and the distance of its perihelion (SDOs generally have highly eccentric orbits and perihelia less than 38 AU) seems hard to reconcile with such celestial mechanics. This has led to some uncertainty as to the current theoretical understanding of the outer Solar System. The theories include close stellar passages, unseen planet/rogue planets/planetary embryos in the early Kuiper belt, and resonance interaction with an outward-migrating Neptune. The Kozai mechanism is capable of transferring orbital eccentricity to a higher inclination.

Physical characteristics 

It is therefore not a dwarf planet candidate.

References

External links 
 List Of Centaurs and Scattered-Disk Objects, Minor Planet Center
 List of Known Trans-Neptunian Objects, Johnston's Archive
 
 

Minor planet object articles (unnumbered)

20140324